Wadley Stadium (known as FNB Wadley Stadium for sponsorship reasons) is an association football stadium located in the township of Georgetown, Edendale near Pietermaritzburg.

It is home to Vodacom League side Maritzburg City F.C.

References

Soccer venues in South Africa
Sports venues in KwaZulu-Natal